7800 may refer to:

 7800, the 800th year of the 8th millennium
 Atari 7800, a third-generation video game console
 GeForce 7800 Series, a member of Nvidia's GeForce 7 Series graphics cards